The Syro-Malabar Church, an Eastern Catholic church of the Catholic Church, traces its origin to apostolic times. Historically,  the church developed as the Malankara Church, a suffragan of the Metropolis of Persia and India under the Church of the East and later elevated as the Metropolis of All India of the Church of the East in the seventh century by Patriarch Ishoʿyahb III. It had the jurisdiction all over India. After the Schism of 1552, the church was integrated with the Chaldean Catholic Church. The efforts of the Portuguese Padroado to liturgical latinisation under the Latin Church archidiocese that culminated in the Synod of Diamper in 1599, led to a suppression of the Syro-Malabar customs and rites, and liturgical Latinisation. In the 20th century, Syro-Malabar Catholics attained greater autonomy and were ultimately made a major archeparchal sui iuris church.

Eparchies

Eparchies outside Kerala 
 Eparchy of Bijnor
 Eparchy of Gorakhpur
 Eparchy of Sagar
 Eparchy of Satna
 Eparchy of Ujjain
 Eparchy of Kalyan
 Eparchy of Rajkot
 Eparchy of Adilabad
 Eparchy of Chanda
 Eparchy of Jagdalpur

Exempt jurisdictions 
 Eparchy of Faridabad, near Delhi, also serves Haryana, (Indian) Punjab, Himachal Pradesh, Jammu and Kashmir and parts of Uttar Pradesh
 Eparchy of Hosur, in Tamil Nadu, established October 2017
 Eparchy of Shamshabad, includes the entire country of India not included in existing eparchies, established October 2017

Outside India 
 Eparchy of Mississauga, for Canada
 Eparchy of Melbourne, for Australia
 Eparchy of Chicago, for the USA
 Eparchy of Great Britain in Preston, England for England, Wales & Scotland

Timeline
May 20, 1887 Two independent Vicariates of Kottayam (present Changanaseri1) and Thrisur2 for Syrians; Charles Lavigne and Adolf Medlycott were made Vicar Apostolic respectively (Quod Jampridem, Pope Leo XIII).

 September 16, 1890 Seat of Kottayam Vicariate moved to Changanaseri.

July 28, 1896 Vicariate of Ernakulam3 created, with territories from both Vicariates of Changanaseri and Thrissur and Bishop Louis Pazheparambil, Bishop Mathew Makkil, and Bishop John Menachery were made the bishops respectively (Quae Rei Sacrae, Pope Leo XIII).
August 29, 1911 Establishment of Kottayam4 Vicariate for the Knanaya (Suddists) Community of the Syrians.

 December 21, 1923 Establishment of the Syro-Malabar Hierarchy with Ernakulam as the Metropolitan See.

July 25, 1950 Eparchy of Pala5
December 31, 1953 Eparchy of Thalaseri6

 July 26, 1956 Changanaseri made Archiparchy

January 10, 1957 Eparchy of Kothamangalam7
March 31, 1962 Eparchy of Chanda,8 Maharashtra (CMI)
July 29, 1968 Eparchy of Sagar,9 Madhya Pradesh (CMI)
July 29, 1968 Eparchy of Satna,10 Madhya Pradesh (VC)
July 29, 1968 Eparchy of Ujjain,11 Madhya Pradesh (MST)
March 23, 1972 Eparchy of Bijnor,12 Uttarakhand (CMI)
March 23, 1972 Eparchy of Jagdalpur,13 Chattisgargh (CMI)
March 1, 1973 Eparchy of Mananthavady14
June 20, 1974 Eparchy of Palakkad15
February 25, 1977 Eparchy of Rajkot16, Gujarat (CMI)
February 26, 1977 Eparchy of Kanjirappally17
June 22, 1978 Eparchy of Irinjalakkuda18
June 19, 1984 Eparchy of Gorakhpur,19 Uttar Pradesh (CST)
April 28, 1986 Eparchy of Thamaraseri20
April 30, 1988 Eparchy of Kalyan,21 Maharashtra

 December 16, 1992 Establishment of Major Archiepiscopal see of Ernakulam-Angamaly
 May 18, 1995 Eparchies of Thrisur and Thalaseri made Archieparchies.

November 11, 1996 Eparchy of Thuckalay,22 Tamil Nadu

 February 3, 1998 Major Archiepiscopal Headquarters at Mount St. Thomas, Kakkanad.

April 24, 1999 Eparchy of Belthangady,23 Karnataka
July 23, 1999 Eparchy of Adilabad,24 Andhra Pradesh (CMI)
July 6, 2001 Eparchy of St. Thomas of Chicago,25 USA.
December 19, 2002 Eparchy of Idukki26

 May 9, 2005 Eparchy of Kottayam made Archieparchy.

August 21, 2007 Eparchy of Bhadravathi,27 Karnataka (MCBS)
 December 23, 2013 Eparchy of Saint Thomas the Apostle of Melbourne established in and for Australia, also acting as Apostolic Visitator for neighbouring New Zealand

References

External links
Syro-Malabar Church Official website
GigaCatholic
Archdiocese of Tellicherry
The website for Synod of Diamper
Archdiocese of Changanacherry
Archdiocese of Trichur
Archdiocese of Ernakulam-Angamaly
Archdiocese of Kottayam
Syro Malabar Mission of San Francisco
Diocese of Palai
St. Raphael Syro Malabar Catholic Mission of Cleveland
St. Thomas Syro-Malabar Church of Philadelphia
Syro-Malabar Mission of Los Angeles
Syro-Malabar Mission of New Jersey
Welcome to Indian Christianity
Christian Musicological Society of India
Congregation of Saint Thérèse of Lisieux: CST Brothers
Carmelites of Mary Immaculate Homepage
Syro-Malabar / Discalced Carmelite Nuns
New Head for Syro-Malabar Church

 
Syro-Malabar